Saint Maccai (or Machai, Maccæus, Mahew) was an Irish missionary who founded a monastery on the Isle of Bute, Scotland. 
His feast day is 11 April.

Monks of Ramsgate account

The monks of St Augustine's Abbey, Ramsgate wrote in their Book of Saints (1921),

Butler's account

The hagiographer Alban Butler (1710–1773) wrote in his Lives of the Fathers, Martyrs, and Other Principal Saints under April 11,

O'Hanlon's account

John O'Hanlon (1821–1905) wrote of Babolin in his Lives of the Irish Saints under April 11.

Notes

Sources

 
 
 

Disciples of Saint Patrick
460 deaths